Asa Rogers (1802 – 1887) was an Virginia farmer, merchant, politician and Confederate officer from Middleburg. Loudoun County, Virginia.

Career
Born at Stone Hill plantation about a mile east of the county seat to Hugh Rogers and his wife, the former Mary Coombs, he was one of eleven children, seven of whom survived to adulthood. Rogers graduated from the University of Virginia and became a lawyer and merchant, as well as operated his own plantations. He also served as a legislator and on the vestry of Emmanuel Episcopal Church in Middleburg.

Middleburg had prospered from its location on a major wagon route from Alexandria, Virginia and Washington, D.C. westward into Winchester, Virginia and the Shenandoah Valley (later U.S. Route 50) as well as its proximity to a major north-south route through Virginia's Piedmont region and northward into Maryland (later U.S. Route 15). In 1836, the Baltimore and Ohio Railroad was completed, and by the 1840s, the wagon route trade had diminished significantly, to the detriment of merchants such as Asa Rogers, who owned a store at Madison and Washington Streets (which remains today as a contributing property to the Middleburg Historic District).

When Virginia seceded from the Union on April 10, 1861 as the American Civil War began, Rogers and his brother Hamilton Rogers enlisted in the local militia, as did four sons of each man. Asa Rogers Sr. was commissioned as a Brigadier General on April 27, his brother Hamilton as a Colonel, and Asa's son Arthur Lee Rogers was commissioned as a Major in the Artillery. All 115 of Middleburg's eligible voters unanimously to secede from the Union. Asa Rogers Senior was captured twice (on February 24, 1862 and July 16, 1862) and exchanged each time. His son Arthur (1831-1871) was sent home as disabled, where he designed a flag for the Confederate States of America which incorporated the Confederate Battle Flag. Mosby's Rangers were formed at Hamilton Rogers' Oakham Farm in December 1862, and several cavalry battles were fought around the area in July 1863, after the Battle of the Wilderness to the south, and both before and after the Battle of Gettysburg further up Route 15 in Pennsylvania. General U.S. Grant in December 1864 authorized a burning raid around Middleburg in retaliation for the damage Mosby's Rangers continued to inflict behind Union lines despite the Confederate Army's decisive loss at the Third Battle of Winchester in September and General Sheridan's march down the Shenandoah Valley.

After the Civil War freed enslaved African Americans, the plantation economy collapsed. The Rogers led opposition to Reconstruction efforts and attempted to maintain both their economic and social status. Middleburg was able to secure its own charter as a town in 1872 as some prosperity returned, but the following year the Panic of 1873 struck. Reconstruction ended when President Rutherford B. Hayes took office in 1877. By 1880, Middleburg remained the county seat, but was no longer the second largest town in the county, but the third—and the decline continued until the century closed, when the old-line families still remembering the pre-Civil War prosperity began an uneasy alliance with former Northerners with equestrian interests. Both Rogers brothers had mortgages on their six large estates (Stone Hill, Mill Hill, Texas Farm, Oakham Farm, Dover, Ellendale, and Clifton), and Dover especially (owned by their brother William, who had been accused of fraud and self-dealing at the expense of the widow Hixon as early as the 1840s) was subject to lawsuits. They were all foreclosed upon in the mid-1870s, but family members were able to buy back three.

Death and legacy
Asa Rogers died in Middleburg, Virginia in 1887. He was buried in Middleburg's Sharon Cemetery.

His wife Ellen'e letters are in the University of Virginia's special collection. Their daughter Lucy Lee Rogers (1833-1862) married the widowed rector of Emmanuel Episcopal Church, Ovid Americus Kinsolving (1822-1894, whom Union forces imprisoned for treason), and two of their sons became Episcopal priests—Rev. Arthur Barksdale Kinsolving (1861-1961)(also known as an author and historian in Maryland) and Rev. Lucian Lee Kinsolving (1862-1929)--as did their half-brothers George Herbert Kinsolving (1849-1928) and Wythe Leigh Kinsolving (1878-1964).

Notes

1802 births
1887 deaths
People from Middleburg, Virginia